Enchytraeidae is a family of microdrile oligochaetes. They resemble small earthworms and include both terrestrial species known as potworms that live in highly organic terrestrial environments, as well as some that are marine. The peculiar genus Mesenchytraeus is known as "ice worms", as they spend the majority of their lives within glaciers, only rising to the surface at certain points in the summer. Enchytraeidae also includes the Grindal Worm (Enchytraeus buchholzi), which is commercially bred as aquarium fish food.

Selected genera
Enchytraeidae genera include:
 Achaeta Vejdovský, 1878
 Archienchytraeus Eisen, 1878 (nomen dubium)
 Cernosvitoviella Nielsen & Christensen, 1959
 Christensenidrilus Dózsa-Farkas & Convey, 1998 (= Christensenia Dózsa-Farkas & Convey, 1997 (non Brinck 1945: preoccupied))
 Cognettia Nielsen & Christensen, 1959
 Enchytraeina Bülow, 1957
 Enchytraeus
 Epitelphusa Drago, 1887
 Fridericia Michaelsen, 1889
Globulidrilus Christensen & Dózsa-Farkas, 2012
 Grania
 Hemifridericia Nielsen & Christensen, 1949
 Henlea Michaelsen, 1889 (= Henleanella)
 Lumbricillus Ørsted, 1844 (= Enchytraeoides, Pachydrilus)
 Marionina Michaelsen in Pfeffer, 1890 (= Marionia Michaelsen, 1889 (non Vayssière, 1877: preoccupied), Michaelsena, Parenchytraeus)
 Mesenchytraeus – ice worms
 Neoenchytraeus Eisen, 1878
 Randidrilus Coates & Erséus, 1985
 Stephensoniella Cernosvitov, 1934

References

  (2008): Enchytraeidae. Version of 2010-MAY-11. Retrieved 2011-FEB-06.

 
Tubificina